The 1936 Troy State Red Wave football team represented Troy State Teachers College (now known as Troy University) as an independent during the 1936 college football season. Led by sixth-year head coach Albert Elmore, the Red Wave compiled an overall record of 3–5. In May 1937, Albert Choate was hired to succeed Elmore as both athletic director and head football coach.

Schedule

References

Troy State
Troy Trojans football seasons
Troy State Red Wave football